

List of Presidents of the University of Louisville
There have been 28 presidents and five interim presidents of what is (or was once a part of) the University of Louisville:

Jefferson Seminary (1813–29)
 Mann Butler 1813–16
 William Tompkins 1816–21
 Charles M. M'Crohan 1821–25
 Francis E. Goddard 1826–29

Louisville Collegiate Institute (1837–40)
 Benjamin F. Farnsworth 1837–38
 John Hopkins Harney 1838–40

Louisville College (1840–46)
 John Hopkins Harney 1840–44

Louisville Medical Institute (1837–1846)
 John Rowan 1837–42
 William Garvin 1842–43
 James Guthrie 1843–46

University of Louisville (post merger of LMI and LC) (1846–present)
 Samuel Smith Nicholas 1846–47
 James Guthrie 1847–69
 Isaac Caldwell 1869–86
 James Speed Pirtle 1886–05
 Theodore L. Burnett 1905–11
 David William Fairleigh 1911–14
 Arthur Younger Ford 1914–26
 George Colvin 1926–28
 John Letcher Patterson 1928–29 (acting)
 Raymond Asa Kent 1929–43
 Einar William Jacobsen 1943–46
 Frederick William Stamm 1946–47 (acting)
 John Wilkinson Taylor 1947–50
 Eli Huston Brown III 1950–51 (acting)
 Philip Grant Davidson 1951–68

University of Louisville, as part of the Kentucky state system
 Woodrow Mann Strickler 1968–72
 William Ferdinand Ekstrom 1972–73 (acting)
 James Grier Miller 1973–80
 William Ferdinand Ekstrom 1980–81 (acting)
 Donald C. Swain 1981–95
 John W. Shumaker 1995–2002
 Carol Garrison 2002 (acting)
 James R. Ramsey 2002–16
 Neville G. Pinto 2016–17 (acting)
 Gregory C. Postel 2017–2018 (acting)
 Neeli Bendapudi 2018–2021
 Lori Stewart Gonzales 2021–present (acting)

References

University of Louisville
University of Louisville, presidents
Louisville